was a town located in Miyazaki District, Miyazaki Prefecture, Japan.

As of 2003, the town had an estimated population of 32,882 and a density of 578.50 persons per km2. The total area was 56.84 km2.

On January 1, 2006, Sadowara, along with the town of Tano (also from Miyazaki District), and the town of Takaoka (from Higashimorokata District), was merged into the expanded city of Miyazaki and no longer exists as an independent municipality.

Residents of Sadowara were known in the region for flying "Kujiranobori", similar to koinobori but in the shape of whales instead of carp.

External links 
 Official website of Miyazaki 

Dissolved municipalities of Miyazaki Prefecture
Miyazaki (city)